The following is a timeline of the history of the municipality of Gothenburg, Sweden.

Prior to 19th century

 1619 - Gothenburg founded by Gustavus Adolphus.
 1621
 Town chartered.
 Gothenburg stave church completed.
 1633 - Gothenburg Cathedral consecrated.
 1650 - Printing press in operation.
 1672 - Gothenburg Town Hall built.
 1680 - Gothenburg and Bohus County established.
 1731 - Swedish East India Company headquartered in Gothenburg.
 1761 -  (glassworks) begins operating.
 1762 -  built.
 1773 - The Vauxhall pleasure gardens is inaugurated.
 1778 - Royal Society of Sciences and Letters in Gothenburg active.
 1779 - Comediehuset, the first theater in the city, is established.
 1786 - Societetsskolan, the first secondary school open to females, is founded.
 1797 - Stay of Polish national hero Tadeusz Kościuszko in the city following the Partitions of Poland (see also Poland–Sweden relations).
 1800 - Population: 12,804.

19th century

 1802 - 22 December: Fire.
 1807 - Fortifications of Gothenburg demolished.
 1812 -  built.
 1813 - Fire.
 1815 - Fruntimmersföreningens flickskola is founded.
 1816 - Segerlindska teatern is founded.
 1826 - Commercial college founded.
 1829 - Chalmers industrial school founded.
 1832
 Göta Canal opens.
 Göteborgs Handels- och Sjöfartstidning newspaper begins publication.
 1833 - Kjellbergska flickskolan is founded.
 1840 - Population: 21,558.
 1843 -  in business.
 1849 - Bourse (Gothenburg) built.
 1850
 Eriksbergs Mekaniska Verkstad (shipbuilder) in business.
 Population: 26,084.
 1851 -  (shipyard) begins operating.
 1854 - Statue of Gustavus Adolphus erected in the Stortorget.
 1858
 Gothenburg Central Station opens.
 Göteborgs-Posten newspaper begins publication.
 1859 - Stora Teatern is founded.
 1860
 Royal Gothenburg Yacht Club founded.
 Population: 37,043.
 1864 -  photo studio active.
 1865 - Population: 43,346.

 1870 -  cafe in business.
 1871 -  (bank) established.
 1874 -  in business.
 1882 -  bookshop in business.
 1884 - Foundation of the Gothenburg's Women's Association and the local women's movement.
 1886 -  bookshop in business.
 1888 -  newspaper begins publication.
 1892 - Population: 107,965.
 1894 -  in business.
 1896 -  (newspaper) begins publication.
 1897 -  (bank) founded.
 1899
 Illustrated  magazine begins publication.
  in business.
 1900
  built.
 Statue of John Ericsson erected in Kungsportsavenyen.
 Population: 130,619.

20th century

1900s-1940s
 1902
 Göteborgs-Tidningen newspaper begins publication.
  (golfing club) formed.
 1903 -  (railway) begins operating.
 1904 - IFK Göteborg (football club) formed.
 1905 - Gothenburg Symphony Orchestra formed.
 1908 -  cinema in business.
 1909 - Population: 163,957.

 1911 -  (regional archives) opens.
 1916
  begins broadcasting.
 1917
 .
 Gothenburg City Theatre established.
 1919 - Palladium Cinema opens.
 1920 - Population: 200,577.
 1922 -  opens.
 1923
 Gothenburg Tercentennial Jubilee Exposition held; Göteborgs Konsthall built.
 Gothenburg Botanical Garden, Liseberg amusement park, and Slottsskogsvallen open.
 1926 - August: 1926 Women's World Games held.
 1934 - Gothenburg City Theatre building opens.
 1936 - Gothenburg city hall building expanded.
 1939 -  opens.
 1940 - Airport built as a military airbase.
 1948 - Polish Veterans Association established by former Polish prisoners of Nazi German concentration camps.

1950s-1990s
 1952
 Folkteatern (theatre) opens.
 Redesign of coat of arms of Gothenburg adopted.
 1954 - University of Gothenburg established.
 1958
 Nya Ullevi (stadium) opens.
 June: Part of the 1958 FIFA World Cup held in Gothenburg.
 1960
 Gothenburg commuter rail begins operating.
 Population: 443,843.

 1971
 Gothenburg District Court established.
 Scandinavium arena opens.
 1972 - Göteborg Marathon begins.
 1977 - Göteborg Horse Show begins.
 1985 - May: Eurovision Song Contest 1985 held.
 1990 - Sister city partnership signed between Gothenburg and Kraków, Poland.
 1993 - Liseberg railway station opens.
 1995 - BioPalatset cinema in business.
 1996 - Nils Ericson Terminal for buses opens.
 1998 - 29 October: Gothenburg discothèque fire.

21st century

 2001 - June: EU summit protest.
 2002 - City co-hosts the 2002 European Men's Handball Championship.
 2005 - Population: 484,942.
 2006
 August: City hosts the 2006 European Athletics Championships.
 December: City co-hosts the 2006 European Women's Handball Championship.
 2008 - City hosts the 2008 World Figure Skating Championships.
 2009
 Gamla Ullevi (stadium) opens.
 Gothenburg Roller Derby league formed.
 2010 - 19 September:  held.
 2011
 Population: 515,129 city; 930,635 metro.
 City co-hosts the 2011 World Men's Handball Championship.
 2013
 1 January: Gothenburg congestion tax introduced.
 January–February: City co-hosts the 2013 Bandy World Championship.
 March: City hosts the 2013 European Athletics Indoor Championships.
 July: City co-hosts the UEFA Women's Euro 2013.
 2015
 19 March: 2015 Gothenburg pub shooting.
 12 June: Car bombing.
 2016 - City co-hosts the 2016 European Women's Handball Championship.
 2018 - 13 August: 2018 Sweden vehicle fire attacks
 2020 - City co-hosts the 2020 European Men's Handball Championship.

See also
 History of Gothenburg
 Timeline of Gothenburg (in Swedish)
 Other names of Gothenburg, e.g. Göteborg, Gotenburg
 Timelines of other municipalities in Sweden:  Stockholm, Uppsala

References

This article incorporates information from the Swedish Wikipedia and Danish Wikipedia.

Bibliography
in English
 
in Swedish
 
 
  1900-

External links

 Europeana. Items related to Gothenburg, various dates
 Digital Public Library of America. Items related to Gothenburg, various dates.

 
Gothenburg
Years in Sweden